Calliotropis regalis, or the regal spiny margarite,  is a species of sea snail, a marine gastropod mollusk in the family Eucyclidae.

In older literature, this species was always synonymized with Margarita regalis Verril & Smlith, 1880 or with Trochus ottoi Philippi, 1844 or with Solariella ottoi Philippi, 1844, all synonyms of Calliotropis ottoi (Philippi, 1844).

Description
The size of an adult shell varies between 6 mm and 18 mm.

Distribution
This species is distributed in European waters along the British Isles and the Faroes, in the Mediterranean Sea, in the Northwest Atlantic Ocean from Nova Scotia to North Carolina.

References

 Turgeon, D.D., et al. 1998. Common and scientific names of aquatic invertebrates of the United States and Canada. American Fisheries Society Special Publication 26 page(s): 60
 Gofas, S.; Le Renard, J.; Bouchet, P. (2001). Mollusca, in: Costello, M.J. et al. (Ed.) (2001). European register of marine species: a check-list of the marine species in Europe and a bibliography of guides to their identification. Collection Patrimoines Naturels, 50: pp. 180–213

External links
 Pollock, L.W. (1998). A practical guide to the marine animals of northeastern North America. Rutgers University Press. New Brunswick, New Jersey & London. 367 pp

regalis
Gastropods described in 1880